John Holloway (9 December 1878 – 15 October 1950) was an Irish athlete. He participated in the men's all-around (a forerunner to the modern decathlon) at the 1904 Summer Olympics, placing fourth.

References

External links 
 

1878 births
1950 deaths
Sportspeople from County Tipperary
Irish decathletes
Olympic athletes of Ireland
Athletes (track and field) at the 1904 Summer Olympics